Park Farm can refer to:

Park Farm, Kent
Park Farm, Port Glasgow
Park Farm, Worcestershire